The 2015–16 season was the 63rd season in the existence of CD Lugo and the club's fourth consecutive season in the second division of Spanish football. In addition to the domestic league, CD Lugo participated in this season's edition of the Copa del Rey.

Players

First-team squad

Out on loan

Transfers

In

Out

Pre-season and friendlies

Competitions

Overall record

Segunda División

League table

Results summary

Results by round

Matches
The league fixtures were announced on 14 July 2015.

Copa del Rey

References

CD Lugo seasons
Lugo